Nikki Leonti-Edgar (born August 20, 1981) is an American singer-songwriter. Prior to her work in urban, R&B, and electronic dance music, Leonti recorded contemporary Christian music albums. She lent her vocals to over 250 songs during 4 seasons of the musical comedy-drama television series Glee.

Early life 
Nicole Marie Leonti was born on August 20, 1981 in Corona, California. Her father Greg Leonti was a pastor at the Calvary Southern Baptist church. She began singing at age five, as a church soloist in the Nondenominational Christianity church in Corona. At 13, she made her first recording on a small local label.

Career

In 1998, Leonti recorded her debut full-length album, Shelter Me, which reached No. 179 on the Billboard 200, and No. 7 on the Contemporary Christian chart. Her second album, Nikki Leonti was released in 2001. Both were produced by brothers Dino and John Elefante, and issued on the independent Christian label, Pamplin. Shortly after her 18th birthday, Leonti  got pregnant out of wedlock and was shunned by the CCM community with many Christian music stations pulling off broadcasting of her records. She retired from the Christian music industry not long after.

In 2006, Leonti was hired as a backup singer for Carrie Underwood, performing on tour and on various television shows. After three years with Carrie Underwood, Leonti began working with Rich Velonskis, forming the R&B group, Nikki & Rich, retro neo-soul duo. Velonskis, also known as Rich Skillz, producer of various artists, including Ludacris, Lil' Kim, and Robin Thicke. Nikki & Rich released their debut album, entitled Greatest Hits, on September 27, 2011, issued on the Reprise Records/Born Rich label. The duo has performed live on Ellen and The Tonight Show with Jay Leno. Together, they were named as one of the New York Post'''s "10 New Artists to Watch in 2010" and "10 Artists to Know in 2011". Nikki & Rich confirmed their split in January 2015.

Nikki lent her vocals to over 100 songs during 4 seasons of the Fox hit show, Glee. She has written songs for artists, including Robin Thicke, Jessie J, Candice Glover, Rebecca Ferguson and Ivy Quainoo.

In early 2015, Nikki announced that she had founded a band called Edgar with her husband Ryan Edgar, whom she married in November 2014. On June 7, 2016, she appeared alongside her husband and daughter Jaslyn as a trio on America's Got Talent, auditioning on episode 2 of season 11. They performed "I'll Stand by You" by The Pretenders. The group progressed through the preliminary rounds and took one of 36 live performance show spots.

In 2018, she performed alongside Crystal Lewis, Stacie Orrico and Rachael Lampa for a special event called REUNITE CCM.

Personal life
Leonti was married in 1999 to Ryan Gingerich, lead guitarist of the Christian band, Scarecrow & Tinmen. They divorced in 2002, having become the parents of one daughter, Jaslyn (b. 2000). They later discovered the marriage was never legally documented. In 2004, she married Aaron Dame and gave birth to their son, Jordan (b. 2004).

She married singer-songwriter Ryan Edgar on November 6, 2014. Ryan Edgar and Leonti have a daughter, Frankie (b. 2015).

Discography
Solo
1996: Reach the World (Two Records)
1998: Shelter Me (Pamplin)
2000: Postcard From Mixaco: A Dance Re-MIX Fiesta (Pamplin)
2001: Nikki Leonti (Pamplin)
2017: Heartache Easy (FamJam)
2019: Joybird (Position Music)

Nikki & Rich
2011: Greatest Hits... (Born Rich Inc)

Adeline River 
2021: Adeline River... (Position Music)

Appearances on other recordings
2000: Apocalypse III: Tribulation Soundtrack, vocals on "Everlasting Place"
2002: Left Behind 2: Urban Hip-Hop; "Everytime"
2004: Rachael Lampa Rachael Lampa (background vocals)
2005: Awaken Natalie Grant (background vocals)
2006: Time Again: Amy Grant Live All Access (background vocals)
2008: Get on Board Eric Bibb (background vocals, handclapping)
2009: Sex Therapy: The Session Robin Thicke; co-writer on "Make you love me"
2010: Killers Soundtrack  (writer: "Cat and Mouse")
2012: Glee (season 3) Vocals 
2012: Cee Lo's Magic Moment, vocals on "All you need is Love" 
2012: Girl vs. Monster Writer: "Nothing's gonna stop me now" 
2013: Tyler, the Creator Vocalist and Vocal Arranger "Camp Fire" 
2013: Glee, season 4; vocals 
2013: Teen Beach Movie Writer: "Crusin' for a bruisin" & "Coolest cats in town" 
2013: Heart Attack (Demi Lovato song) background vocals 
2014: The Little Rascals Save the Day'' (video), vocals on "My Friend", "Time For Run"
2014: Ivy Quainoo Writer: Burial 
2014: Glee (season 5) Vocals
2014: Candice Glover Music Speaks Writer: "Same kinda man" 
2015: Teen Beach 2 Writer: "That's how we do" 
2015: Mac Miller Vocalist and Vocal Arranger "100 Grankids" & "Perfect Circle/Godspeed" 
2015: Light On (song) Writer as performed by Rebecca Ferguson
2015: Rod Stewart (album) Background vocals 
2015: Josh Groban Vocals: "Never walk alone" 
2015: We Love Disney (2015 album) Backing vocalist for Ariana Grande
2015: Liv and Maddie: Music from the TV Series writer: "what a girl is" 
2016: The Passion Live Soundtrack; vocals on eight tracks
2016: Ice Age: Collision Course Writer: "My Superstar" performed by Jessie J (listed as Nicole Leonti and written with  Alexander Geringas)
2016: Kirk FranklinPharrell Williams Backing Vocals; "123 Victory"
2016: Hidden Figures (soundtrack) "I see a victory" backing vocals (listed as Nicole Leonti)
2017: Dirty Dancing (2017 film) Contributing vocalist
2017: Captain Underpants: The First Epic Movie Contributing vocalist
2017: Nut Job 2 Songwriter: "Everybody Get Nuts" 
2017: Descendants 2 Songwriter: "You and Me"
2018: Zombies (2018 film) Songwriter: "Fired up"
2018: Jessie J "This Christmas" Album: Backing Vocalist 
2018:Tori Kelly "Never Alone" Album: Backing Vocalist
2018: The Grinch (movie) Vocalist and Arranger for Tyler, the Creator&Danny Elfman Collaboration: "You're a mean one, Mr. Grinch"
2018: Mac Miller Vocalist and Vocal arranger for : "Buttons"
2019: Perfect Harmony (TV series) Contributing Vocalist
2019: A Pentatonix Christmas Contributing Vocalist
2019: Roddy Ricch Arrangements/Vocals "War Baby 
2020: Kelly Clarkson Show Appeared as backing vocalist on several episodes 
2020: Eurovision Song Contest Contributing Vocalist 
2021: The Prom (movie) Contributing Vocalist 
2021: Arlo the Alligator Boy Choir Arranger and contributing Vocalist
2022: Monarch (American TV series) Contributing Vocalist

Filmography

References

External links 

 

American contemporary R&B singers
Living people
1981 births
21st-century American singers